The Church of St Michael and All Angels, Bramcote is an Anglican parish church in Bramcote, Broxtowe, Nottinghamshire, England.

History and description

Saint Michael and All Angels Parish Church, Bramcote was opened on 12 December 1861, replacing the previous Parish Church of Bramcote, whose tower still remains.

The new church was designed by the architect John Johnson.

The spire of the church is 130 ft high and underwent major repairs in 2011 – the church's 150th anniversary year. The 13th-century font from the old church was transferred to the new in 1861.

The church is Grade II listed by the Department for Digital, Culture, Media and Sport as a building of special architectural or historic interest.

See also
Listed buildings in Bramcote

Sources
The Buildings of England, Nottinghamshire, 1951. Nikolaus Pevsner

External links

Bramcote
Churches completed in 1861
19th-century Church of England church buildings
Bramcote
1861 establishments in England